John McEnroe defeated the five-time defending champion Björn Borg in a rematch of the previous year's final, 4–6, 7–6(7–1), 7–6(7–4), 6–4, to win the gentlemen's singles tennis title at the 1981 Wimbledon Championships. It was his first Wimbledon singles title and third major singles title overall. Borg was attempting to equal William Renshaw's record of six consecutive Wimbledon titles and Roy Emerson's all-time record of 12 major titles.

During this tournament, McEnroe famously shouted "You cannot be serious!" to the chair umpire in response to a serve being called "out". The disagreement took place on June 22 during his first round match against Tom Gullikson.

Seeds

  Björn Borg (final)
  John McEnroe (champion)
  Jimmy Connors (semifinals)
  Ivan Lendl (first round)
  Gene Mayer (withdrew before the tournament began)
  Brian Teacher (second round)
  Brian Gottfried (second round)
  Roscoe Tanner (second round)
  José Luis Clerc (third round)
  Guillermo Vilas (first round)
  Víctor Pecci (first round)
  Peter McNamara (quarterfinals)
  Yannick Noah (first round)
  Wojciech Fibak (fourth round)
  Balázs Taróczy (third round)
  Vitas Gerulaitis (fourth round)

Gene Mayer withdrew due to injury. He was replaced in the draw by lucky loser Mike Estep.

Qualifying

Draw

Finals

Top half

Section 1

Section 2

Section 3

Section 4

Bottom half

Section 5

Section 6

Section 7

Section 8

References

External links

 1981 Wimbledon Championships – Men's draws and results at the International Tennis Federation

Men's Singles
Wimbledon Championship by year – Men's singles